Samir Radwan is an Egyptian politician who served in the government of Egypt as Minister of Finance from January 2011 to July 2011. He is an economist with a liberal viewpoint, interested in employment and human development issues.

Education
Radwan received his BSc from Cairo University, moving onto the School of Oriental and African Studies for an MSc in the economics of underdeveloped countries—his thesis was on import substitution industrialization—and the University of London for a PhD on capital formation in Egyptian industry and agriculture from 1882 to 1967, marking the British occupation of Egypt and the Arabs' defeat in the Six Day War with Israel, respectively. The process, as well as facilitating epistemological growth, enabled him to empathize with such figures as Mohammed Ali, ruler of Egypt, and the nationalist industrial entrepreneur Talaat Harb.

Career
Radwan worked at the International Labour Organization (ILO), and the last position he held there was that of adviser to the director general on development policies and counsellor on Arab countries. This served the dual purpose of earning him an international professional standing while keeping him, through one project after another, in more or less direct contact with Egypt: "I never really thought of myself as an expatriate." He also served as a board member of Egypt's General Authority for Investment.

On 31 January 2011, amidst mass protests against President Hosni Mubarak, Radwan was appointed as Minister of Finance in the cabinet led by Ahmed Shafik, replacing Youssef Boutros-Ghali in the post.

References

External links
Senior Associate at the Economic Research Forum
Profile at ESCWA

 

Year of birth missing (living people)
Living people
People from Beheira Governorate
Cairo University alumni
Finance Ministers of Egypt
People of the Egyptian revolution of 2011

ar:سمير رضوان